An Axel lift in pair skating is a movement in which the woman is turned over her partner's head one and a half times.
From a position of holding hands on one side, her partner lifts her with his hand under her armpit and the lift begins from the woman's outside forward edge and ends on the outside backward edge of her opposite skate. The man rotates below her during the movement.

External links
Axel lift

Figure skating elements
Pair skating